Āryā meter is a meter used in Sanskrit, Prakrit and Marathi verses. A verse in  metre is in four metrical lines called pādas. Unlike the majority of meters employed in classical Sanskrit, the  meter is based on the number of s (morae) per . A short syllable counts for one , and a long syllable (that is, one containing a long vowel, or a short vowel followed by two consonants) counts for two s.  It is believed that  meter was taken from the gatha meter of Prakrit.  metre is common in Jain Prakrit texts and hence considered as favourite metre of early authors of Jainism.  The earlier form of the  metre is called old , which occurs in a some very early Prakrit and Pàli texts.

Āryā
The basic  verse has 12, 18, 12 and 15 s in the first, second, third, and fourth pādas respectively. An example is the following from Kālidāsa's play Abhijñānaśākuntalam (c. 400 CE):

 – u u | – – | u u –
 u – u | – – | u – u | – – | –
 u u u u | u – u | – –
 – – | – – | u | – – | –

"I do not consider skill in the representation of plays to be good (perfect) until (it causes) the satisfaction of the learned (audience); the mind of even those who are very well instructed has no confidence in itself."

Another example is from Nīlakaṇṭha Dīkṣita's Vairāgya-śataka (17th century CE):

 – – | – u u | – –
 – – | – u u | u – u | – – | –
 – – | – u u | – –
 – – | – – | u | – u u | –

"People who know morality, know the inner order of conduct, know the Vedas (sacred knowledge), know the Scriptures or know the Supreme Spirit Himself are plentiful; but rare are those who know about their own ignorance."

The metrical treatise  lays down several other conditions:
 Odd numbered  should not be  (u – u).
 The sixth  should be .

Gīti
The  meter has 12, 18, 12 and 18 s in its four s respectively.

 lists several other conditions.

Upagīti
The  meter has 12, 15, 12 and 15 s in its four s respectively.

 lists several other conditions.

Udgīti
The  meter has 12, 15, 12 and 18 s in its four pādas respectively.

 lists several other conditions.

Āryāgīti
The  meter has 12, 20, 12 and 20 s in its four s respectively.

 lists several other conditions.

See also
Jain Prakrit
Vedic meter
Jain Agamas

References

External links
 Recitation of the above examples by Dr R. Ganesh
 Grammatical commentary on Kalidasa's verse
 Nilakaṇṭha Dīkṣita (Hindupedia article)

Buddhist poetry
Poetic rhythm
Indian poetics